Omurbek Chirkeshovich Tekebayev (Kyrgyz: Өмүрбек Чиркешович (Чиркеш уулу) Текебаев, Ömürbek Çirkeşoviç (Çirkeş uulu) Tekebayev) is a Kyrgyz politician. He was Speaker of the Kyrgyz Parliament from March 2005 to March 2006. Tekebaev is the leader of the Ata-Meken socialist party. Tekebayev is currently serving an eight-year jail sentence for corruption and fraud.

Early life
Tekebaev was born on 22 December 1958 in Jalal-Abad, Kyrgyz SSR. He graduated in physics from the Kyrgyz State University. He then worked as a teacher in Akman Bazar-Korgonskyj, a village in Jalal-Abad Province, and then graduated in law from the Kyrgyz State National University in 1994.

Political career
Tekebayev was a leading opposition figure to the government of President Askar Akayev, which had ruled Kyrgyzstan since its independence in the early 1990s, following the collapse of the Soviet Union.  Tekebayev ran twice for the presidency in the 1995 and 2000 elections.  In 2000 he formed an election bloc with Felix Kulov and came in a distant second to Akayev with 14% of the vote; however, opposition leaders widely alleged electoral fraud.

On March 27, 2005, Tekebayev became Speaker of Parliament following the 2005 parliamentary elections.  In the turmoil that followed, Akayev was forced to flee the country and an interim government headed by President Kurmanbek Bakiyev claimed power (see: Tulip Revolution).  Tekebayev emerged as an important figure in the transitional chaos, both due to his constitutional role as head of parliament and because while Akayev refused to recognize Bakiyev's authority as interim president, he did recognize Tekebayev's authority as Speaker of Parliament and indicated a willingness to negotiate with him. Ultimately these negotiations failed, however, and Bakiyev was elected as President in a landslide victory in July 2005.

Tekebayev announced his resignation as Speaker of Parliament after a political conflict with President Bakiyev on February 27, 2006.

On September 6, 2006, heroin was found in Tekebayev's luggage during a trip to Poland, in an incident generally regarded as an attempted frame.

Omurbek Tekebayev, in his capacity of co-chairman of the For Reforms political movement, played a key role in organizing very visible political protests against President Bakiyev in November 2006 and April 2007.

In April 2017, he was detained at Bishkek airport after flying from Vienna. The prosecutor general's office said in a statement that he took a $1m bribe from a Russian investor in 2010.

On 16 August 2017, Tekebayev was sentenced by a court to eight years imprisonment for corruption and fraud. He denied any wrongdoing and described his case as politically motivated.

References

Chairmen of the Supreme Council (Kyrgyzstan)
Living people
1958 births
People from Jalal-Abad Region
Ata Meken Socialist Party politicians
Kyrgyz National University alumni
Prisoners and detainees of Kyrgyzstan
Kyrgyzstani prisoners and detainees
Politicians convicted of corruption
Politicians convicted of fraud